St. Johns River State College is a public college in Northeast Florida with campuses in Palatka, St. Augustine, and Orange Park. Founded in 1958 (for organizational purposes) as St. Johns River Junior College, it is part of the Florida College System and one of several colleges in the system designated a "state college", meaning they can offer more bachelor degrees than traditional community colleges. It is accredited by the Southern Association of Colleges and Schools. Florida School of the Arts, Florida's first state-sponsored arts school, is housed within the Palatka Campus.

History
According to the college's Web site, the first president, Dr. B. R. Tilley, was appointed in 1958 and the college opened its doors that year; however Walter Smith states that Tilley was appointed in 1959 "to plan for the opening". Initial classes were held in a Baptist church, until it could build its Palatka facility; the school later expanded with campuses in Orange Park and St. Augustine in order to serve Putnam, St. Johns, and Clay Counties. It was founded simultaneously with Collier-Blocker Junior College, for negro students, and nominally absorbed the institution in 1964, although none of the faculty and few of the students moved  to St. Johns. Between 1966 and 2011, when it adopted its current name, it changed its name to St. Johns River Community College. The adoption of its current name coincided with its designation as a state college that can offer a greater number of bachelor's degrees to its academic programs. The current president of the college is Joe Pickens. He took over from Dr Robert L. McLendon Jr., who had served as president of the college from 1972 to 2008.

In 2012, a wall was created with portraits and other mementos of Collier-Blocker.

The Thrasher-Horne Center for Performing Arts opened on the Orange Park campus in 2004.

Florida School of the Arts
Florida School of the Arts (colloquially known as FloArts) is an accredited arts school under the umbrella of St. Johns River State College. It is located in the F building of the Palatka Campus. It was first opened in 1976, designed to be an intimate setting where students received close and individual attention. Florida School of the Arts offers course concentrations with accredited Associate in Science and Associate in Arts degrees in the fields of Visual Art (Animation, Studio Art, Graphic Design/New Media, Photography), Acting, Dance, Musical Theatre, and Theatre Production/Design (Costume Design, Scenic/Lighting Design, Stage Management).

Campus locations

Palatka Campus (Putnam County)
St. Augustine Campus (St. Johns County)
Orange Park Campus (Clay County)
Florida School of the Arts (Palatka Campus)

Notable alumni and attendees

References

External links
 

Two-year colleges in the United States
Educational institutions established in 1958
Education in Clay County, Florida
Education in St. Johns County, Florida
Florida College System
Palatka, Florida
Tourist attractions in Palatka, Florida
Education in Putnam County, Florida
St. Augustine, Florida
Buildings and structures in St. Johns County, Florida
Universities and colleges accredited by the Southern Association of Colleges and Schools
Universities and colleges in the Jacksonville metropolitan area
Buildings and structures in Putnam County, Florida
Buildings and structures in Clay County, Florida
1958 establishments in Florida